Bungle may refer to:

 Bungle (Rainbow), a fictional children's television character
 Bungle Bungle Range, in the Purnululu National Park in northern Western Australia
 The Bungle Family, an American comic strip
 Mr. Bungle, an experimental rock/avant-garde metal band
 The Glass Cat, also called Bungle, a fictional character from the Land of Oz books

See also
 Bungles, a 1916 series of short films
 Bangle, a rigid bracelet
 Botch (disambiguation)